Lately I Feel Everything (stylized as lately I feel EVERYTHING) is the fourth solo studio album by American singer Willow. It was released through MSFTSMusic, Roc Nation and Polydor Records on July 16, 2021. A departure from the experimental alt-R&B sound of her early works and instead her pop-punk and indie rock debut, it features guest appearances from Travis Barker, Avril Lavigne, Tierra Whack, Cherry Glazerr, and Ayla Tesler-Mabe.

The album has spawned three singles, "Transparent Soul", "Lipstick", and "Gaslight", the first of which entered the top 40 in the United Kingdom, Ireland, and New Zealand, as well as becoming Willow's first entry on the Billboard Hot 100 in a decade, where it peaked at number 76.

Composition
Lately I Feel Everything, the fourth album by singer Willow, poses another wide musical leap for the musician. Where 2019's self-titled record leapt into psychedelic soul, Lately dives head on into alternative rock and especially pop-punk sounds. It has been described as having songs that are indie rock, emo, grunge, nu metal, pop rock, and power pop.

Critical reception

Year-end lists

Commercial performance 
Lately I Feel Everything debuted at number 46 on the US Billboard 200. The album entered the UK Album Sales chart at number 85.

Track listing

Notes
 "Transparent Soul" is stylized as "t r a n s p a r e n t s o u l"
 "Don't Save Me" is stylized as "don't SAVE ME"
 "Naïve" is stylized in lowercase
 "Xtra" is stylized in all caps
 "Grow" is stylized as "G R O W"
 "Breakout" is stylized as "¡BREAKOUT!"

Personnel
 Willow Smith – vocals
 Zach Brown – engineering (all tracks), mixing (2–4, 6–7, 9, 11)
 Michelle Mancini – mastering (all tracks)
 Tyler Cole – drums, guitar, programming (6)
 Travis Barker – drums, programming (1, 3, 10)
 Mario McNulty – mixing (1, 3–4, 6–11)
 Matt Chamberlain – drums (2, 4–11)
 Ayla Tesler-Mabe – vocals (7)
 Tierra Whack – vocals (9)
 Avril Lavigne – vocals (10)
 Cherry Glazerr – vocals (11)

Charts

References

2021 albums
Willow Smith albums
Roc Nation albums
Pop rock albums by American artists
Nu metal albums by American artists
Alternative rock albums by American artists
Emo albums by American artists
Indie rock albums by American artists
Pop punk albums by American artists
Contemporary R&B albums by American artists
Alternative R&B albums